Potalia is a genus of flowering plants belonging to the family Gentianaceae.

Its native range is Southern Tropical America.

Species:

Potalia amara 
Potalia chocoensis 
Potalia coronata 
Potalia crassa 
Potalia elegans 
Potalia maguireorum 
Potalia resinifera 
Potalia turbinata 
Potalia yanamonoensis

References

Gentianaceae
Gentianaceae genera